Keith Ferguson (born April 3, 1959 in Miami, Florida) is a former American football defensive end who played in the National Football League from 1981 through 1990.

Early Years

Ferguson was born in Miami, Florida.  A Prep All American at Miami (FL) Edison, Ferguson was one of the most heavily recruited high school players to come out of Miami-Dade County in the 1970s. During his sophomore year in 1974, Ferguson played in the final Thanksgiving Day rivalry game between Edison vs. Miami High at the Orange Bowl. Ferguson mostly played offensive line in high school.

College career

Ferguson accepted an athletic scholarship to attend Ohio State University in Columbus Ohio, where he went on to become a defensive lineman for coach Woody Hayes and Earle Bruce from 1977 to 1980.

Professional career

The San Diego Chargers selected Ferguson in the 5th round of the 1981 NFL Draft.  He played 10 seasons in the NFL with the Chargers and the Detroit Lions.  His best season came in 1986 for the Lions, when he started 15 games, recorded 9.5 sacks, recovered 1 fumble, and had 1 interception.

External links
NFL.com player page

Now works in as a High School Teacher/Football Coach in Houston, Texas

1959 births
Living people
Players of American football from Miami
American football defensive ends
Ohio State Buckeyes football players
San Diego Chargers players
Detroit Lions players